István Bagi (born 23 March 1989) is a Hungarian football player who plays for Győri ETO.

External links 
Player Profile at Kecskemeti TE Official Website
HLSZ
Player Profile at magyarfutball.hu

1989 births
Living people
People from Csongrád
Hungarian footballers
Association football defenders
Kecskeméti TE players
Mezőkövesdi SE footballers
Békéscsaba 1912 Előre footballers
Kisvárda FC players
Győri ETO FC players
Nemzeti Bajnokság I players
Nemzeti Bajnokság II players
Sportspeople from Csongrád-Csanád County